Peninsula Temple Sholom (PTS) is a Reform Jewish Congregation in Burlingame, California.  It was founded in 1955, and since then, has constantly grown its congregation and has expanded its facilities to include a social hall, a Religious School and a Preschool.  For five decades, its services were led by Rabbi Gerald Raiskin, who changed the legacy and history of the temple until his passing in 2006.  Throughout the years, PTS clergy and lay leaders have continued to lead services for hundreds of reform Jews in the Bay Area and is an influential place for them to find community and practice  Reform Judaism.

Clergy 
Rabbi Daniel J. Feder  joined PTS (Peninsula Temple Sholom) in July 2006 as a Senior Rabbi. Before arriving to Peninsula Temple Sholom, Rabbi Feder was a Rabbi at Keneseth Israel in Allentown, Pennsylvania., for seven years. Prior to that, he was assistant Rabbi at Temple Oheb Shalom in Baltimore, Md. Rabbi Feder was born in San Francisco, and grew up going to Congregation Emanu-El. He earned his Bachelor of Arts from the University of California, Berkeley, and he earned a Master of Arts from Hebrew Union College (HUC). Rabbi Feder was ordained in the year 1994 from HUC. Rabbi Feder has three daughters and is married to Sandra Feder who is an author of children's books.

Rabbi Lisa Delson Since moving to the Bay Area, Rabbi Delson has been nominated to serve on the Pacific Area Reform Rabbis board and the Rabbinic Advisory Committee of Shalom Bayit: Ending Domestic Violence in Jewish Homes. She is currently a Brickner Rabbinic Social Justice Fellow through the URJ's Religious Action Center (RAC). At PTS, Rabbi Delson serves as the clergy person overseeing Caring Community and the Social Action/Justice initiatives. She teaches the 9th grade students as well as guides students in their students toward becoming b'nai mitzvah. Rabbi Delson is also the clergy liaison to the PTS Preschool while also leading the community in prayer and adult education. Prior to coming to PTS, Rabbi Delson served as Assistant Rabbi and Program Director at Temple Beth Emeth in Ann Arbor, Michigan. She received her master's degree in Hebrew Letters in 2008 and rabbinic ordination by the Hebrew Union College-Jewish Institute of Religion in Cincinnati in 2009. Rabbi Delson earned a B.A. in Sociology and Judaic Studies from the University of Cincinnati in 2004.

Rabbi Molly Plotnik Rabbi Plotnik received her M.A. in Jewish Education from the Hebrew Union College-Jewish Institute of Religion's Rhea Hirsch School of Education and was recently ordained by HUC-JIR in Los Angeles in 2015. During her time at HUC-JIR, Rabbi Plotnik authored her curriculum guide for adult education entitled "Intentional Living: Refining Your Beliefs and Realigning Your Actions," and her rabbinic thesis entitled "Implementing Green Theology in Reform Synagogues." While in Rabbinical school, Rabbi Plotnik further pursued her interest in the intersection of Judaism and the environment by spending several summers working for Adamah Adventures, a Jewish outdoor adventure camp based out of Atlanta.

Cantor Barry Reich is a fifth generation Cantor and has been working at Peninsula Temple Sholom as the Bar Mitzvah and prayer teacher, as well as Choral Director, for 50 years. He will be retiring in 2018, to be succeeded by Cantor Alexandra Fox. Cantor Barry participates with the rabbis in worship services and life cycle events. Cantor Barry received his education at “The Breed Yeshiva” In L.A., and later went to the Ross McKee Conservatory of Music and the San Francisco Conservatory of Music, to earn a bachelor's degree in Music. In 1979, he received his Hazzan commission from the Cantors Assembly of the Jewish Theological Seminary of America. In August 2007, Cantor Reich received his Rabbinic ordination, from the Israel Institute of Religious Studies. He also serves as the Northern California representative for the Cantors Assembly.

Religious School and Preschool 

Religious school was established in January, 1956. At that year,
136 students were enrolled. On November 19, 1957 PTS was given the right to purchase property on Sebastian Drive for the construction of a new synagogue and religious school. In 1958, Chester Zeff was hired to be the first religious school director. In the 1982 a new preschool was added to the temple.
By 2004, the temple was completely reconstructed, and a new school building opened. Once a month each grade in the religious school has the opportunity to lead a service. The Religious School curriculum  includes the study of sacred texts, Jewish life cycle, Jewish ethics, Jewish holidays, the history of Israel, the holocaust, modern-day Israel, and Hebrew language.

Past Presidents 

 Herbert Fields
 Mel Dollinger
 Leonard Lean
 Benjamin Slade
 Abe S. Miller
 Dr. Bertram Solomon
 Emanuel Kuby
 Leonard Berger
 Harvey Carter
 Jack Ramen
 Henry Glasser
 Sol J. Robinson
 Irwin S. Levin
 Louis Starr
 Guenther Leopold
 Leonard Sarkon
 David Monasch III
 Larry Moskovitz
 Sandra Oberstein
 Steve Barkoff
 Diane Goldman
 Dr. Charles Pascal
 Donald Woolfe
 Mark Herbach
 Don Ermann
 Gary Pollard
 Marcia Barkoff
 Karen Wisialowski
 Keith Tandowsky
 Brian Hafter
 Alan Zeichick 
 April Glatt 
 Lauren Schlezinger - Current President

Senior Rabbis 
 Rabbi Gerald Raiskin, z’’l 1956 - 2006
 Rabbi Daniel Feder 2006–present

Cantor 
Cantor Emeritus Barry Reich (1967–2018)
Cantor Alexandra Fox (2018–2020)
Cantor Anna Zhar (2020-2022)
Cantor Yonah Kliger (2022-Present)

Notable members
Dianna Agron, actress
Scott Feldman, who became a Major League Baseball pitcher

References

1955 establishments in California
Synagogues completed in 1961
Reform synagogues in California
Jewish organizations established in 1955
Religious buildings and structures in San Mateo County, California
Burlingame, California
Religious schools in California